The 1819 Alabama gubernatorial election was held on September 20–21, 1819, to elect the first governor of Alabama. Democratic-Republican candidate William Wyatt Bibb defeated fellow Democratic-Republican candidate Marmaduke Williams with 53.82% of the vote. The debate over where Alabama's permanent capital should be was reportedly an important issue in the race - Williams supported Tuscaloosa while Bibb proposed Cahawba. After the election, Cahawba was made capital, but it was moved to Tuscaloosa in 1825.

General election

Candidates
William Wyatt Bibb, Governor of the Territory of Alabama
Marmaduke Williams, Delegate to the Alabama Constitutional Convention and Senator for North Carolina 1803–09

Results

By county

References

Alabama gubernatorial elections
Alabama
1819 Alabama elections
September 1819 events